Birds-foot trefoils (Lotus species) are used as food plants by the larvae of some Lepidoptera species including:

Monophagous species which feed exclusively on Lotus

Coleophora case-bearers:
C. discordella
C. oriolella (feeds exclusively on L. rectus)
C. squamella (feeds exclusively on L. cytisoides)
Plebejus idas lotis (lotus blue butterfly), a possibly extinct gossamer-winged butterfly last recorded near Mendocino County, California, in 1983, is conjectured to have used Lotus formosissimus as its larval food plant.

Polyphagous species which feed on Lotus among other plants

Chionodes species
C. fumatella (recorded on L. corniculatus)
C. lugubrella
Coleophora accordella (recorded on L. scoparius)
Flame (Axylia putris)
Lime-speck pug (Eupithecia centaureata)
Northern deep-brown dart (Aporophyla lueneburgensis)
Six-spot burnet (Zygaena filipendulae)

Notes

External links

Lotus
+Lepidoptera